The 1983 European Amateur Team Championship took place 22–26 June at Golf de Chantilly, in Chantilly, France. It was the 13th men's golf European Amateur Team Championship.

Venue 
The hosting club was founded in 1909. The Vineuil Course, situated in Chantilly, in the forest of the Hauts-de-France region of Northern France, 50 kilometres (30 miles) north of the center of Paris, close to the Château de Chantilly and Chantilly Racecourse, was originally designed by John Henry Taylor and later redesigned by Tom Simpson and Donald Steel. It had previously hosted eight editions of the Open de France.

For the 1983 European Amateur Team Championship, the course was set up with par 71 over 7,108 yards.

Format 
Each team consisted of five or six players, playing two rounds of an opening stroke-play qualifying competition over two days, counting the five best scores each day for each team. 

The eight best teams formed flight A, in knock-out match-play over the next three days. The teams were seeded based on their positions after the stroke play. The first placed team were drawn to play the quarter final against the eight placed team, the second against the seventh, the third against the sixth and the fourth against the fifth. Teams were allowed to use six players during the team matches, selecting four of them in the two morning foursome games and five players in to the afternoon single games. Games all square at the 18th hole were declared halved, if the team match was already decided.

The seven teams placed 9–15 in the qualification stroke-play formed flight B and the four teams placed 16–19 formed flight C, to play similar knock-out play to decide their final positions.

Teams 
19 nation teams contested the event. Each team consisted of five or six players.

Players in the leading teams

Other participating teams

Winners 
Team Scotland won the opening 36-hole competition, with a score of 8 over par 718.

Individual leader was Peter McEvoy, England, with a score of 8-under-par 134, five strokes ahead of Tore Christian Sviland, Norway. In his second round, McEvoy scored 8 birdies and 10 pars for an 8-under-par 63 score on the Chantilly course.

Team Ireland won the gold medal, earning their third title, beating Spain in the final 5–2. Team Italy earned the bronze on third place, after beating Scotland 4–3 in the bronze match.

Results 
Qualification round

Team standings

* Note: In the event of a tie the order was determined by the best total of the two non-counting scores of the two rounds.

Individual leaders

 Note: There was no official award for the lowest individual scores.

Flight A

Bracket

Final games

* Note: Games declared halved, since team match already decided.

Flight B

Bracket

Flight C

Final standings

Sources:

See also 
 Eisenhower Trophy – biennial world amateur team golf championship for men organized by the International Golf Federation.
 European Ladies' Team Championship – European amateur team golf championship for women organised by the European Golf Association.

References

External links 
 European Golf Association: Full results

European Amateur Team Championship
Golf tournaments in France
European Amateur Team Championship
European Amateur Team Championship
European Amateur Team Championship